Petts is a surname and may be:

 John Petts (artist) (1914–1991), Welsh artist
 John Petts (footballer), English football player and manager
 Judith Petts, British academic
 Kusha Petts (1921–2003), British artist
 Paul Petts (born 1950s), English professional footballer
 Valerie Petts, English watercolourist

See also
 Pett
 Petts Wood